Igreja de Santa Maria de Marvila is a church in Portugal. It is classified as a National Monument.

This church is believed to have been rebuilt on the foundations of an old mosque in the Islamic medina of Santarém after the Christian Reconquista.

Gallery

See also
 List of former mosques in Portugal

References

Churches in Santarém District
National monuments in Santarém District
Former mosques in Portugal